Euriphene paralysandra, or D'Abrera's Lysandra nymph, is a butterfly in the family Nymphalidae. It is found in Nigeria. The habitat consists of forests.

References

Butterflies described in 2004
Euriphene
Endemic fauna of Nigeria
Butterflies of Africa